Vito Taccone (6 May 1940 – 15 October 2007) was an Italian road cyclist.

Taccone made his professional debut in 1961. In the same year he won the Giro di Lombardia. During the 1964 Tour de France, he was accused of causing other cyclists to fall , leading to a fight with Spanish racer Fernando Manzaneque and his non-appearance in following tours.

His other victories include one Giro del Piemonte (1962), one Giro della Toscana (1963), one Milano–Torino (1965) and five stages overall at the 1963 Giro d'Italia.

In June 2007, he was arrested and charged with selling counterfeit and stolen clothing.

References

External links

La Stampa obituary (Italian)

1940 births
2007 deaths
People from Avezzano
Italian male cyclists
Tour de Suisse stage winners
Cyclists from Abruzzo
Sportspeople from the Province of L'Aquila